Helen Francis Hood (28 June 1863 – 22 January 1949) was an American pianist, composer and teacher. She was born in Chelsea, Massachusetts, and studied music in Boston with Benjamin Johnson Lang, J.C.D. Parker, John Knowles Paine, and George Chadwick. She continued her studies in Berlin with Moritz Moszkowski and Philipp Scharwenka. She was awarded a diploma and medal for her achievements at the World's Columbian Exposition, Chicago, Illinois. She died in Brookline, Massachusetts.

Works 
Hood may have composed the first American trio for piano, violin and cello. Selected works include:
Disappointment
The Violet
Cornish Lullaby
Robin
Shepherdess
Message of the Rose

References

1863 births
1949 deaths
19th-century classical composers
20th-century classical composers
American music educators
American women music educators
American women classical composers
American classical composers
People from Chelsea, Massachusetts
Pupils of George Whitefield Chadwick
19th-century American composers
20th-century American women musicians
20th-century American composers
Classical musicians from Massachusetts
20th-century women composers
19th-century women composers
19th-century American women musicians